Dr. Anna Mahase is a Trinidadian educator and administrator. She was principal of the St. Augustine Girls' High School in Trinidad and Tobago. She currently is the commissioner of teaching of the Republic of Trinidad and Tobago. She is noted for her service to education as well as to other public and charitable organisations.

Early life and education 
Mahase was born in the village of Guaico, Trinidad, to Kenneth Mahase and Anna Mahase (Sr.). Her mother was the first Indian woman to become a teacher in 1918. Her father was headmaster and her mother a senior teacher at several Canadian Mission (CM) schools. Both played a role in developing early education in rural North East Trinidad.

Mahase attended the Guaico CM School (Guaico Presbyterian Primary School), followed by Naparima Girls' High School in San Fernando. Afterwards, she studied at Mount Allison University in New Brunswick, Canada, graduating with a BSc and BEd.

She subsequently received an honorary degree of Doctor of Laws from Mount Allison University and another from the University of the West Indies.

Career 
After her studies, Mahase returned to Trinidad and Tobago and after was appointed headteacher of St. Augustine Girls' High School. She was the first local woman to hold this post. Her achievements and ideas became the standard for many other secondary schools.

During her long service, Mahase received many awards and honours.

National awards:
Medal of Merit (Gold) (1976)
Chaconia Medal (Gold) (1990)
To Commemorate the 50th Anniversary of the Independence of Trinidad and Tobago - selected in top 50 persons to receive in excellence in education and distinguished public service (2012)

Notable service:
 Member of the Caribbean Examinations Council
 Task Force for Removal of the Common Entrance Examination 
 Member of the Council of University of the West Indies
 President of the Trinidad and Tobago Red Cross Society
 Chairman of Trinidad and Tobago Television, NBS
 Head Assessor Guardian Neediest Cases Fund
 Chairman, National Commission on Accreditation 
 Government senator (temporary) during the 6th Republican Parliament (2001)
 Commissioner of Teaching Service Commission
 Chairman of the Red Cross Carnival Committee

References 

Year of birth missing (living people)
Heads of schools in Trinidad and Tobago
Living people
Women civil servants
Mount Allison University alumni
Trinidad and Tobago women
People from Sangre Grande region
Recipients of the Chaconia Medal